Hunley Agee Elebash (July 23, 1923 – October 20, 1993) was bishop of the Episcopal Diocese of East Carolina from 1973 to 1983.

Early life and education
Elebash was born on July 23, 1923, in Pensacola, Florida, the son of Eugene Perrin Elebash and Ann Hunley Agee. He was educated at Pensacola High School. He later studied at Sewanee: The University of the South and graduated with a Bachelor of Science in 1944. He married Maurine Ashton on November 2, 1946, and together had a son and a daughter±. In 1950 he also graduated with a Bachelor of Divinity from the University of the South.

Ordained ministry
Elebash was ordained deacon on June 23, 1950, and priest on March 15, 1951, by Bishop Frank Juhan of Florida at St John's Cathedral, Jacksonville, Florida. He served as assistant priest at St Mark's Church in Jacksonville, Florida, from 1950 to 1953 before becoming rector of St Catherine's Church in Jacksonville, Florida, in 1953. In 1957 he became rector of St John's Church in Wilmington, North Carolina, a post he acquired on January 15, 1957. In 1964 he left St John's and became the executive secretary of the Diocese of East Carolina.

Bishop
In 1968, Elebash was elected Coadjutor Bishop of East Carolina and was consecrated on October 2, 1968, at St James' Church in Wilmington, North Carolina, by Presiding Bishop John E. Hines. He succeeded as diocesan in 1973 and retired in August 1983.

References 

"Retired Episcopal Leader Hunley Elebash is Dead", Star-News, October 21, 1993, p. 28.

1923 births
1993 deaths
20th-century American Episcopalians
People from Pensacola, Florida
Sewanee: The University of the South alumni
Episcopal bishops of East Carolina
20th-century American clergy